The Watkins Copicat is an audio effects unit that produces delay and reverb effects. One of the first commercially available tape delay units, the original Copicat model was produced by Watkins Electric Music beginning in 1958. The Copicat became one of Watkins' most successful products, and the company produced various Copicat models and versions over the following decades.

History
In 1960, inspired by the tape echo unit used on Marino Marini Quartet's song "Come prima", Charlie Watkins, co-founder of London music shop Watkins Electric Music, had the idea for a simple, affordable, portable tape echo unit. With the help of engineer Bill Purkis, Watkins designed the Watkins Copicat, a compact (12-inch by 8-inch) valve-based tape echo unit with three replay heads and selector switch, and a feedback loop for a variable echo-repeat effect.

Watkins' shop sold the entire first production run of 100 Copicats on the first day, including the very first Copicat sold to Johnny Kidd of Johnny Kidd & the Pirates, whose guitarist used it on the group's UK hit song "Shakin' All Over". 

The Copicat, which preceded other major European echo units like the Binson Echorec, Meazzi Echomatic, and Vox Echo Deluxe, would become one of the company's most successful products, with Watkins (later branded as WEM) releasing various different Copicat models over more than 50 years.

The Copicat became one of Watkins' most successful products, and the company produced various Copicat models and versions over the following decades.

Models
Watkins Copicat Mk1 
Watkins Copicat Mk2 (1961) (turquoise) or (1964) (black & cream) - rotary head replaced by push buttons
WEM Custom Copicat (1966) - repeat, multi-repeat, reverberation, 2 inputs, 2 gain controls. Also marketed under Kent by Hagstrom
The Shadow Echo
WEM Copicat MkIII (1970s) - Solid State
WEM Copicat MkIV - highest volume model produced, also produced as a Guild-branded version to answer US demand
WEM Copicat IC300 (late 70s)
WEM Copicat IC300 Super (late 70s) - simplified electronics, lighter
WEM Halle Cat (1975) - Copicat combined with 4-channel mixer
WEM Copicat Varispeed
WEM Copicat Varispeed IC400
WEM Copicat IC500
WEM Copicat Super Shadow Type 1 (1990s) - valve/tube with Varispeed
WEM Copicat Super Shadow Type 2 (1990s)
Watkins Copicat Gold (2009) - a programmable unit that emulates the characteristics of various Copicat models, as well as classic Binson, Meazzi, and Space Echo units.

Software emulations
Wavesfactory makes an analogue-modelling delay plug-in emulation of the Copicat called the Echo Cat.

References

Effects units